The arrest of Jagtar Singh Johal is a detainment that occurred in November 2017 in Punjab, India.

Arrest 
Jagtar Singh Johal was arrested in India in 2017. According to the United Nation's Working Group on Arbitrary Detention, Mr Johal has been detained "arbitrarily" and should be released immediately. Following their investigations, the UN group concluded that Mr Johal's detention without trial was "on discriminatory grounds, owing to his status as a human rights defender and based on his political activism, religious faith and opinions," something Mr Johal's family have asserted since he was first arrested in 2017. Jagtar Singh Johal has told the BBC that he had been tortured and forced to sign false confession statements. Jagtar Singh Johal is accused for the involvement in the murders of Brigadier (retd) Jagdish Gagneja, RSS leader Ravinder Gosain and Pastor Sultan Masih and for funding of the terrorist organization Khalistan Liberation Force in November 2017, for which there is no judicially admissible evidence against him, despite intelligence agencies having over three years to investigate. Johal has not been brought to trial.

Johal is a British Sikh from Dumbarton, Scotland suspected of involvement in numerous political killings in Punjab.

Reason for arrest 
The Indian authorities have not yet provided Johal's lawyer with evidence linking him to any crimes, thereby making it impossible for Johal to be brought to trial. Johal's lawyer alleges there is no such evidence, implying that the Indian authorities are deliberately and illegally detaining Johal. While in custody, Johal was also charged with another crime.

His family allege that he was falsely detained and forced to sign blank statements and face torture in prison. Police have denied these claims and termed them "emotional drama", noting that anyone suffering the extent of torture alleged by Johal would have succumbed to his wounds. International and Sikh human rights groups in Punjab and the diaspora, as well as over 140 U.K. Members of Parliament (MPs), including the former Brexit secretary David Davis; the former international development secretary Hilary Benn; the father of the house, Sir Peter Bottomley; the SNP leader at Westminster, Ian Blackford; Sheffield's mayor, Dan Jarvis; the former Foreign Office minister Lord Hain; the former Liberal Democrat leader Menzies Campbell; and Andrew Rosindell, a Conservative member of the foreign affairs select committee have written to Dominic Raab urging him to do more to secure the release of Johal. They are concerned over Johal's detention and allegations of brutal treatment towards Johal - the Indian police have been accused of torturing him whilst in custody. The Indian government has cited significant Khalistani outreach towards Indian-origin British MPs for their support towards Johal and insisted that their opposition is based on appeasing sentiments of large voting blocs.

Current Situation (April 2022) 

Mr Johal's case had now been forwarded to the UN's Special Rapporteur on torture and other cruel, inhuman or degrading treatment or punishment for further investigation. A UK government spokesperson said: "We have consistently raised our concerns about Mr Johal's case with the government of India, including his allegations of torture and mistreatment and his right to a fair trial.

UK Intelligence Services Involvement 

On August 22, 2022, it was reported by The Times that MI5 and MI6 spies supplied information that led to the torture of a British citizen in India, apparently in breach of Britain's commitment to human rights.

See also 
 2016–17 Targeted killings in Punjab, India
Foreign Office scaling back support for UK Sikh activist held in India, Keir Starmer says

References 

2017 in India
Human rights abuses in India